Bidens is a genus of flowering plants in the aster family, Asteraceae. The genus include roughly 230 species which are distributed worldwide. Despite their global distribution, the systematics and taxonomy of the genus has been described as complicated and unorganized. The common names beggarticks, black jack, burr marigolds, cobbler's pegs, Spanish needles, stickseeds, tickseeds and tickseed sunflowers refer to the fruits of the plants, most of which are bristly and barbed. The generic name refers to the same character; Bidens comes from the Latin bis ("two") and dens ("tooth").

Distribution
Bidens includes roughly 230 species which are distributed worldwide throughout many tropical and warm temperate regions. Species occur in the Americas, Africa, Polynesia, Europe and Asia.

Phylogeny, taxonomy and diversity 

Despite their global distribution, the systematics and taxonomy of the genus has been described as complicated and unorganized. The genus include roughly 230 species.

Bidens is closely related to the American genus Coreopsis, and the genera are sometimes difficult to tell apart; in addition, neither is monophyletic.

Propagation
Bidens are zoochorous; their seeds will stick to clothing, fur or feathers, and be carried to new habitat. This has enabled them to colonize a wide range, including many oceanic islands. Some of these species occur only in a very restricted range and several are now threatened with extinction, notably in the Hawaiian Islands. Due to the absence of native mammals on these islands, some of the oceanic island taxa have reduced burrs, evolving features that seem to aid in dispersal by the wind instead.

Human use and interactions
Nodding beggarticks (B. cernua) and hairy beggarticks (B. pilosa) are useful as honey plants. Several Bidens species are used as food by the caterpillars of certain Lepidoptera, such as the noctuid moth Hypercompe hambletoni and the brush-footed butterfly Vanessa cardui, the painted lady. 

The Bidens mottle virus, a plant pathogen, was first isolated from B. pilosa, and it infects many other Asteraceae and plants of other families.

Species

Species include:

 Bidens alba (L.) DC. – romerillo
 Bidens amplectens Sherff – Waianae kokoolau	 	
 Bidens amplissima Greene – Vancouver Island beggarticks
 Bidens aristosa (Michx.) Britt. – bearded beggarticks, long-bracted beggarticks, tickseed sunflower, western tickseed
 Bidens asymmetrica (Levl.) Sherff – Koolau kokoolau, Ko'olau Range beggarticks
 Bidens aurea (Ait.) Sherff – Arizona beggarticks
 Bidens beckii – Beck's water-marigold, Henderson's water-marigold, Oregon water-marigold
 Bidens bidentoides (Nutt.) Britt. – Delmarva beggarticks
 Bidens bigelovii A.Gray – Bigelow's beggarticks
 Bidens bipinnata L. – Spanish needles, hemlock beggarticks, gui zheng cao
 Bidens biternata
 Bidens cabopulmensis
 Bidens campylotheca Sch.Bip.– viper beggarticks
 Bidens cernua L. (syn. B. glaucescens Greene) – nodding beggarticks, nodding bur-marigold
 Bidens cervicata Sherff – Kauai beggarticks
 Bidens chippii (M.B.Moss) Mesfin
 Bidens conjuncta Sherff – bog beggarticks
 Bidens connata Muhl. ex Willd. – purplestem beggarticks
 Bidens coronata (L.) Britt. – crowned beggarticks
 Bidens cosmoides (A.Gray) Sherff – cosmosflower beggarticks, poola nui
 Bidens cynapiifolia Kunth – West Indian beggarticks, alfilerillo
 Bidens discoidea (Torr. & A.Gray) Britt. – discoid beggarticks, small beggarticks, swamp beggarticks, few-bracted beggarticks
 Bidens eatonii Fern. – Eaton's beggarticks, bident d'Eaton
 Bidens ferulifolia (Jacq.) DC. – Apache beggarticks, fern-leaved beggarticks
 Bidens forbesii Sherff – coastal bluff beggarticks
 Bidens frondosa L. – devil's beggarticks, devil's pitchfork, devil's bootjack, pitchfork weed, common beggarticks, sticktights. Pitchfork weed (B. frondosa) is considered to be a weed in New Zealand. 
 Bidens gardneri Baker – ridge beggarticks
 Bidens hawaiensis A.Gray – Hawaii beggarticks
 Bidens henryi Sherff
 Bidens heterodoxa (Fern.) Fern. & H.St.John – Connecticut beggarticks, bident différent 
 Bidens heterosperma Gray – Rocky Mountain beggarticks
 Bidens hillebrandiana (Drake) O.Deg. – seacliff beggarticks
 Bidens hyperborea Greene – estuary beggarticks, coastal beggarticks, northern estuarine beggarticks, seacliff beggarticks
 Bidens laevis (L.) B.S.P. – smooth beggarticks, smooth bur-marigold, larger bur-marigold. Smooth beggarticks (B. laevis) is a common fall flower in the southeastern United States. 
 Bidens lemmonii Gray – Lemmon's beggarticks
 Bidens leptocephala Sherff – few-flowered beggarticks
 Bidens leptophylla
 Bidens macrocarpa (Gray) Sherff – large-fruited beggarticks
 Bidens macroptera (Sch.Bip. ex Chiov.) Mesfin
 Bidens mannii T.G.J.Rayner
 Bidens mauiensis (Gray) Sherff – Maui beggarticks
 Bidens maximowicziana
 Bidens menziesii (Gray) Sherff – Mauna Loa beggarticks
 Bidens meyeri V.A.Funk & K.R.Wood
 Bidens micrantha Gaud. – grassland beggarticks
 B. micrantha ssp. kalealaha Nagata & Ganders – Kalealaha beggarticks
 Bidens mitis (Michx.) Sherff – small-fruited beggarticks
 Bidens molokaiensis (Hillebr.) Sherff – Molokai beggarticks, wedge beggarticks
 Bidens × multiceps Fassett
 Bidens nudata Brandegee – Cape beggar's tick, Baja tickseed
 Bidens parviflora
 Bidens pachyloma – Meskel Flower
 Bidens pilosa S.F.Blake – hairy beggarticks
 Bidens polylepis S.F.Blake
 Bidens populifolia Sherff – Oahu beggarticks
 Bidens radiata
 Bidens reptans (L.) G.Don – manzanilla trepador
 Bidens sandvicensis Less. – shrubland beggarticks
 Bidens schimperi Sch.Bip.
 Bidens simplicifolia C.H.Wright
 Bidens socorrensis
 Bidens squarrosa Kunth
 Bidens subalternans DC.
 Bidens tenuisecta A.Gray – slim-lobed beggarticks
 Bidens torta Sherff – corkscrew beggarticks
 Bidens trichosperma (Michx.) Britton – crowned beggarticks
 Bidens tripartita L. (syn. B. acuta, B. comosa) – three-lobed beggarticks, three-part beggarticks, leafy-bracted beggarticks, trifid bur-marigold
 Bidens triplinervia Kunth
 B. triplinervia var. macrantha (Wedd.) Sherff
 Bidens valida Sherff – Mt. Kahili beggarticks
 Bidens vulgata Greene – big devil's beggarticks, tall beggarticks, tall bur-marigold, western sticktight
 Bidens wiebkei Sherff – Wiebke's beggarticks

Formerly placed here
Cosmos atrosanguineus (Hook.) Voss (as B. atrosanguinea (Hook.) Ortgies ex Regel)
Cosmos bipinnatus Cav. (as B. formosa (Bonato) Sch.Bip.)
Melanthera nivea (L.) Small (as B. nivea L.)
Salmea scandens (L.) DC. (as B. scandens L.)
Thelesperma megapotamicum (Spreng.) Kuntze (as B. megapotamica Spreng.)

Photo gallery

References

External links
 
 
 

 
Asteraceae genera
Taxa named by Carl Linnaeus